Elska is a bi-monthly magazine, dedicated to male photography and culture. The magazine was launched in the United Kingdom but is now based in the United States.

History
Elska magazine stylized as elska was created by Liam Campbell, and its first edition was released in September, 2015. Its name means "love" in Icelandic. Liam Campbell, editor-in-chief of Elska was named as one of 100 LGBT trailblazers In February 2021 issue of Attitude magazine.

Overview
Elska is published six times a year. It features photographs by its chief photographer Liam Campbell as well as guest features by established and emerging photographers. Each issue is dedicated to and shot in a different city, featuring photospreads of local men, each accompanied by stories which are mostly written by the men themselves and allow the participants to candidly open up about their lives.

Elska has been defined as "part intellectual queer pin-up mag and part sexy anthropology journal". One of the main ideas which separates Elska from other gay photography related publications is that it does not feature perfect models, but instead focuses on real people with their imperfections, presenting real life people and stories, and providing a kaleidoscope glimpse at queer men and community around the globe. It is a multicultural magazine, with issues themed on cities around the world and on all continents

Elska has become known for its diversity, profiling people of various races, ages, and body types. It has also been described as having a message of body positivity, and was described by The Advocate as "probably the nicest, most sincere magazine to have ever been created". The magazine assumes the idea that it does not matter what shape, size, colour, or race a person has, he is beautiful. In addition to print issues, all the issues are also available in electronic magazine format.

Issues

1 Lviv, Ukraine
2 Berlin, Germany
3 Reykjavík, Iceland
4 Lisbon, Portugal
5 Taipei, Taiwan
6 Istanbul, Turkey
7 Cardiff, Wales, UK
8 Toronto, Canada
9 Yokohama, Japan
10 Mumbai, India
11 Providence, Rhode Island, USA 
12 Brussels, Belgium
13 Helsinki, Finland
14 Haifa, Israel
15 Bogotá, Colombia
16 Cape Town, South Africa
17 Perth, Australia
18 Los Angeles, California, USA
19 London, England, UK
20 Lyon, France
21 Seoul, South Korea
22 Stockholm, Sweden
23 Dhaka, Bangladesh
24 Guadalajara, Mexico
25 Manila, Philippines
26 Pittsburgh, Pennsylvania, USA
27 Warsaw, Poland
28 Amsterdam, Netherlands
29 Kuala Lumpur, Malaysia
30 Sydney, Australia
31 Belfast, Northern Ireland, UK
32 Dublin, Ireland
33 São Paulo, Brazil
34 Atlanta, Georgia, USA
35 Casablanca, Morocco
36 Montréal, Québec
37 Bern, Switzerland
38 Athens, Greece

Reissues
Berlin, Germany (with additional materials and new cover)
Reykjavík, Iceland (with additional materials and new cover)
Lisbon, Portugal (with additional materials and new cover)
Toronto, Canada (with additional materials and new cover)

Special editions
15 Icelandic Swimming Pools

Elska Ekstra
The magazine also publishes the e-zine Elska Ekstra stylized as elska ekstra where it puts up some of the materials that didn't make the cut for the main elska city issue, but was still worth a look.

References

External links
Elska magazine
Elska Ekstra e-zine
Elska magazine blog by editor-in-chief and main photographer Liam Campbell
Entrevue avec Liam Campbell d'Elska Magazine

Bi-monthly magazines published in the United Kingdom
Gay men's magazines published in the United Kingdom
Magazines established in 2015
Photography magazines